Margot Blakely later Margot Hawley (born 1950) is an alpine skier from New Zealand.

She competed for New Zealand at the 1968 Winter Olympics at Grenoble, but was disqualified in the slalom.

She is a sister of 1976 and 1980 Olympic alpine skier Stuart Blakely.

References 
 Black Gold by Ron Palenski (2008, 2004 New Zealand Sports Hall of Fame, Dunedin) p. 103,110

External links 
 
 

Living people
1950 births
New Zealand female alpine skiers
Olympic alpine skiers of New Zealand
Alpine skiers at the 1968 Winter Olympics